Directive may refer to:
 Directive (European Union), a legislative act of the European Union
 Directive (programming), a computer language construct that specifies how a compiler should process input
 "Directive" (poem), a poem by Robert Frost
 Directive speech act, a particular kind of speech act which causes the hearer to take a particular action
 Lative case, a grammatical case that indicates direction

See also
 
 Direction (disambiguation)